In Greek mythology, Pedias (Ancient Greek: Πεδιάδα means 'flat, level') was the Lacedamonian daughter of Mynes. She married the autochthonous King Cranaus who reigned in Athens and bore him three daughters: Cranaë, Cranaechme, and Atthis.

Note

Reference 

 Apollodorus, The Library with an English Translation by Sir James George Frazer, F.B.A., F.R.S. in 2 Volumes, Cambridge, MA, Harvard University Press; London, William Heinemann Ltd. 1921. . Online version at the Perseus Digital Library. Greek text available from the same website.

Queens in Greek mythology
Laconian characters in Greek mythology
Attic mythology